The New York Bill of Rights is a statutory bill of rights enacted in 1787 in the U.S. state of New York.

See also
United States Bill of Rights

External links
New York Bill of Rights– full text 

Constitutional law
New York (state) law